Cenobio Ruiz (23 March 1934 – 20 April 1999) was a Mexican cyclist. He competed in the sprint event at the 1960 Summer Olympics.

References

External links
 

1934 births
1999 deaths
Mexican male cyclists
Olympic cyclists of Mexico
Cyclists at the 1960 Summer Olympics
Sportspeople from Durango
Pan American Games medalists in cycling
Pan American Games bronze medalists for Mexico
Cyclists at the 1955 Pan American Games
Medalists at the 1955 Pan American Games